Wave Motion is a 2002 studio album by Fat Jon the Ample Soul Physician. It consists of tracks from his two previously released EPs, Dyslexic and Stasis. It peaked at number 19 on CMJ's Hip-Hop chart.

Critical reception
Martin Woodside of AllMusic gave the album 4.5 stars out of 5, describing it as "a mellow, moody instrumental collection  sleepy soul and down-tempo funk." He said, "The beats are crisp but light, and the vibe is extremely laid-back." Paul Cooper of Pitchfork gave the album an 8.2 out of 10, saying, "Fat Jon is a conscientious and gifted producer with a talent for creating tracks that work on multiple levels simultaneously. He said, "Wave Motion isn't an accessory or an alternative like so many instrumental albums; Wave Motion is a serious proposition and a statement not only of Fat Jon's studio abilities but also of his introspective aesthetic."

Track listing

References

External links
 

2002 albums
Fat Jon albums
Mush Records albums
Instrumental hip hop albums
Albums produced by Fat Jon